The Giving Pledge is a campaign to encourage extremely wealthy people to contribute a majority of their wealth to philanthropic causes. , the pledge has 236 signatories from 28 countries. Most of the signatories of the pledge are billionaires, and as of 2016, their pledges are estimated to total US$600 billion.

Description
The organization's stated goal is to inspire the wealthy people of the world to give at least half of their net worth to philanthropy, either during their lifetime or upon their death. The pledge is a public gesture of an intention to give, not a legal contract. On The Giving Pledge's website, each individual or couple writes a letter explaining why they chose to give.

History
In June 2010, the Giving Pledge campaign was formally announced and Bill Gates and Warren Buffett began recruiting members. As of August 2010, the aggregate wealth of the first 40 pledgers was $125 billion. As of April 2011, 69 billionaires had joined the campaign and given a pledge, and by the following year, The Huffington Post reported that a total of 81 billionaires had pledged. By May 2017, 158 individuals and/or couples were listed as pledgers. Not all pledgers are billionaires.

List of pledgers

Net worth is as of 2022 unless otherwise noted.  A list of signatories is available online.

See also 

 Charity (practice)
 Charitable organization
 Earning to give
 Effective altruism
 List of members of the Forbes 400
 Philanthrocapitalism
 The World's Billionaires
 Venture philanthropy
 Giving What We Can

References

External links
 

 
Organizations established in 2010
Philanthropic organizations based in the United States
Non-profit organizations based in Washington (state)
Buffett family
2010 establishments in the United States